Oecanthus pellucens, common name Italian tree cricket, is a species of tree crickets belonging to the family Gryllidae, subfamily Oecanthinae.

Subspecies
Subspecies include: 
 Oecanthus pellucens calinensis  Jannone, 1936
 Oecanthus pellucens pellucens  (Scopoli, 1763)

Distribution
This species is present in most of Europe, especially in the countries around the Mediterranean with a focus on Southern Europe. The northern boundary runs through northern France, Belgium, southern Germany, the Czech Republic and southern Poland. The first, apparently viable, British colony was discovered near Dungeness in Kent in 2015. In southern Europe there is also the closely related and very similar species Oecanthus dulcisonans. It is also present in the eastern Palearctic realm, in the Near East, and in North Africa.

Habitat
The typical habitat of Oecanthus pellucens are sunny meadows with high vegetation and dry warm and nutrient-poor areas such as grasslands, sand dunes and brownfield lands.

Description
The colouration of Oecanthus pellucens is yellowish-brown, straw-colored. The body is very elongated and slender. The wings usually protrude out slightly above the abdomen, but can be shorter or longer. The wings of the males are larger than those of females. The antennae are longer than the body. The ovipositor of the female is long and slightly curved. The females are recognizable by the club-shaped end of the ovipositor.

Biology
Adults can be encountered from July through October. These crickets are mainly nocturnal. The males rub their wings together (stridulation) to produce a subtle but constant, fluctuating in volume sound. They sing from about five o'clock until three o'clock in the morning. After mating, the female lays her eggs in plant stems, especially in grape (Vitis vinifera). In June the nymphs live in the tissue and leaves of the plant. A few days after the last molt the male begins to sing. These crickets are omnivorous and  usually feed on leaves or delicate flower parts such as pollen and petals, but also on animal foods such as aphids, spiders and insect larvae.

Gallery

References

External links
 Hlasek
 Encyclopedia of Life

pellucens
Orthoptera of Europe
Insects described in 1763
Taxa named by Giovanni Antonio Scopoli